is a Japanese sailor. He and Kimihiko Imamura placed 17th in the men's 470 event at the 2016 Summer Olympics.

References

External links
 
 
 

1992 births
Living people
Japanese male sailors (sport)
Olympic sailors of Japan
Sailors at the 2016 Summer Olympics – 470
Asian Games medalists in sailing
Asian Games silver medalists for Japan
Sailors at the 2014 Asian Games
Medalists at the 2014 Asian Games
21st-century Japanese people